Puleng LenkaBula is a South African academic and university administrator. She is the first ever female vice-chancellor of the University of South Africa (UNISA).

She studied theological ethics at the University of South Africa, writing a PhD thesis on the ethics of bioprospecting in 2006. She was dean of students at the University of the Witwatersrand before joining the University of the Free State (UFS), where she was vice-rector of institutional change, student affairs and community engagement.

In November 2020 she was announced as the successor to Mandla Makhanya as principal and vice-chancellor of UNISA, in a unanimous decision by the university council. Her appointment comes into effect on 1 January 2021, though the council has extended Makhanya's term to April 2021 to ensure a smooth handover.

Works

References

University of South Africa alumni
Academic staff of the University of South Africa
Vice-Chancellors by university in South Africa
Year of birth missing (living people)
Living people
South African theologians
Women theologians
South African ethicists